Green Man Gaming is an eCommerce portal from British-based online video game retailer, distributor and publisher, Green Man. It has gained 4.7 million users since its release back in 2010.

Business Model 
Green Man Gaming works with companies like Steam, Uplay, Origin, and the Epic Games Store to sell game keys that customers then redeem on those respective platforms at retail and discounted prices.

History

In 2009, Paul Sulyok formed Green Man Gaming with Lee Packham. Sulyok had previously been the CEO of Prize Fight, an online gaming platform, and Packham had been responsible for developing the technology behind Prize Fight. Green Man Gaming officially started trading on the 10th of May 2010.

Lee Packham developed and managed the initial launch of the retail platform, and created a new method for facilitating a Video Game Exchange for Green Man Gaming. Users who downloaded games from its "Capsule" gaming client with SecuROM DRM could then trade some of their digital games for credits, which could be used to purchase anything on the Green Man Gaming website. This worked by deactivating the code required to play the game, which was then re-sold as a 'pre-owned' game. Capsule was retired in 2016.

At the end of 2011, Callum Jay joined Green Man Gaming as the CFO, coming from a background in finance direction. Tim Sawyer also joined Green Man Gaming as their EVP Operations in 2011, previously serving as the head of e-commerce at MeMega Retail Ltd. After a year-long sabbatical at Twitter to develop TweetDeck's iOS, Lee Packham returned to Green Man Gaming as co-founder and EVP Engineering.

On 9 July 2012, Green Man Gaming announced its merger with Playfire. At the time of acquisition, Playfire had more than 1.2 million users, tracking over 50,000 video games on the website and allowing users to automatically track their gameplay and in-game achievements or trophies from Steam, PlayStation Network, and Xbox Live. At the end of July 2012, Green Man Gaming expanded its multi-platform portfolio to include selling boxed games, and PC-DVD, Xbox 360, Xbox One, PS3, and PS4 games, as well as consoles and peripherals.

In March 2014, CEO Paul Sulyok was named as one of the 100 most influential people working in the British video game industry by trade publication, MCV.

On 30 September 2014, Green Man Gaming launched its own publishing arm, Green Man Loaded, now known as Green Man Gaming Publishing. Gary Rowe, former SVP Publishing and Content at SEGA joined the label as EVP Green Man Loaded.

In October 2016, the company reached an agreement with Sony Interactive Entertainment to sell digital titles for PlayStation 4 consoles through redemption keys. However, by March 2019, Sony had opted to stop retail and digital sales of redemption keys across all markets, including Green Man Gaming.

In March 2017, Green Man Gaming launched its first local language eCommerce website in Germany. Following this expansion, Green Man Gaming rolled out sites in 10 different languages including Chinese and South Korean.

In April 2017, Green Man Gaming appointed former Take-Two CEO, Paul Eibeler, to its Board as an Advisor.

Green Man Gaming announced an extension of its current publishing program in January 2020 through its Digital Partners Program, allowing any developer to take advantage of a menu of publishing support options through the company, as well as metrics that the company has obtained through its storefront. One of the first titles published through the program was GTFO.

In February 2021, Green Man Gaming partnered with Payload Studios to support studio founders from underrepresented backgrounds through the Tentacle Zone Incubator.

Published Games

Controversy
In 2015, Green Man Gaming responded to accusations of unauthorized keys being sold on the Store. The majority of keys come directly from publishers, with the occasional need to offer keys for games from publishers that are unable to provide them directly due to commercial restrictions.

Following this, in November 2015, the company placed information on each game's store page on their site to identify the source of the redemption keys, either through Green Man Gaming, which comes directly from the publisher, or through an authorized third-party reseller for full transparency.

References

External links

2009 establishments in England
British companies established in 2009
Software companies based in London
Internet properties established in 2009
Internet properties established in 2010
Online-only retailers of video games
Video game companies established in 2009
Video game companies of the United Kingdom
Video game publishers